Alessio Di Chirico (born December 12, 1989) is an Italian former mixed martial artist who competed in Middleweight division of the Ultimate Fighting Championship (UFC).

Background
Di Chirico was born in Rome, Italy. He attended University of Foro Italico, majoring in Sport and Science. He started playing American football when he was young and he was the linebacker for Grizzlies Rome from 2008 to 2011. He started MMA training to lose weight and his friend Giovanni Pinelli introduced MMA  to him, and decided to transition to MMA from American football after 2011. He joined Roman Gymnasium Hung Mun and started his MMA training there.

Mixed martial arts career

International Mixed Martial Arts Federation
The International Mixed Martial Arts Federation, partnering with  Tuff-N-Uff, organised first-ever Amateur MMA World Championships in Las Vegas in 2014 and Di Chirico won the 2014 International Mixed Martial arts Federation (IMMAF) Light Heavyweight amateur title on July 1. Di Chirico said winning the IMMAF World Championship was the greatest moment of his career saying, "I won the IMMAF world championship in Vegas and raised the flag very high and very proudly for the first time in my life."

Early career
Di Chirico fought in the European-based promotions and amassed a record of 9-0 prior to joining UFC.

Ultimate Fighting Championship
Di Chirico made his promotional debut at UFC Fight Night: Rothwell vs. dos Santos on April 10, 2016.  He faced Bojan Veličković and he lost the bout by unanimous decision.

On August 27, 2016, Di Chirico faced Garreth McLellan on UFC on Fox: Maia vs. Condit. He won the fight via split decision.

He next faced Eric Spicely on UFC on Fox: Shevchenko vs. Peña on January 28, 2017. He lost the fight via submission (triangle choke) in the first round.

Di Chirico was expected to face Rafael Natal at UFC on Fox: Weidman vs. Gastelum on July 22, 2017. However, Di Chirico pulled out in the weeks leading up to the event due to a neck injury and was replaced by promotional newcomer Eryk Anders.

Di Chirico faced Oluwale Bamgbose on December 16, 2017 at UFC on Fox 26. He won the fight via knockout in the second round. This win earned him the Performance of the Night bonus.

Di Chirico faced Julian Marquez on July 6, 2018 at The Ultimate Fighter 27 Finale. At the weigh-ins, Julian Marquez weighed in at 190 lbs, four pounds over the middleweight limit of 186. He was fined 30% of his fight purse to Di Chirico and the bout proceeded at a catchweight. He won the fight via split decision.

Di Chirico was expected to face Jared Cannonier on November 17, 2018 at UFC Fight Night 140. However, it was reported on October 19, 2018 that Cannonier would face David Branch at UFC 230 and  Di Chirico was pulled from the card.

Di Chirico was expected to face Tom Breese on March 17, 2019 at UFC Fight Night 147. However Di Chirico pulled out of the fight in early January citing an undisclosed injury and subsequent surgery.

Di Chirico faced Kevin Holland on June 22, 2019 at UFC Fight Night 154. He lost the fight by unanimous decision.

Di Chirico was expected to face Peter Sobotta on September 28, 2019 at UFC Fight Night 160. However, Sobotta was forced out of the bout with an injury and replaced by promotional newcomer Makhmud Muradov. He lost the fight via unanimous decision.

Di Chirico was linked to fight promotional newcomer Antônio Arroyo on November 16, 2019 at UFC Fight Night 164. However, it was announced on October 24, 2019, that Arroyo was scheduled to fight André Muniz instead.

Di Chirico was scheduled to face Abu Azaitar on April 11, 2020 at UFC Fight Night: Overeem vs. Harris. Due to the COVID-19 pandemic, the event was eventually cancelled.

Di Chirico faced Zak Cummings on August 29, 2020 at UFC Fight Night 175. He lost the fight via unanimous decision.

Di Chirico faced Joaquin Buckley on January 16, 2021 at UFC on ABC: Holloway vs. Kattar. He won the fight in the first round via a head kick knockout. This win earned him the Performance of the Night award.

Di Chirico was scheduled to face Roman Dolidze on June 5, 2021 at UFC Fight Night 189. However, Di Chirico pulled out of the contest in mid-May due to an injury. He was replaced by Laureano Staropoli.

Di Chirico was scheduled to face promotional newcomer Aliaskhab Khizriev on August 28, 2021 at UFC on ESPN 30.  However, Khizriev was pulled from the event for due to injury  and Di Chirico was scheduled to face Abdul Razak Alhassan instead. Di Chirico lost the fight via knockout seventeen seconds into round one.

Di Chirico was scheduled to face Albert Duraev on October 30, 2021 at UFC 267. However, Di Chirico was removed from the pairing on 22 September for undisclosed reasons and replaced by Roman Kopylov.

Di Chirico faced Roman Kopylov on September 3, 2022 at UFC Fight Night 209. He lost the fight via knockout in round three.

After the loss, Di Chirico announced his retirement from MMA.

Championships and accomplishments
Ultimate Fighting Championship
Performance of the Night (Two times)

Personal life
Di Chirico is founder of his current MMA Team, the GLORIA Fight Center based in Rome.

Di Chirico considers Italian MMA fighters to be knights instead of gladiators for Italians. MMA fighters are gentlemen, committing to fight for a principle and for an idea, according to his philosophy.

He also owns a bar in Rome.

Mixed martial arts record

|-
|Loss
|align=center|13–7
|Roman Kopylov
|KO (punches)
|UFC Fight Night: Gane vs. Tuivasa
|
|align=center|3
|align=center|1:09
|Paris, France
|
|-
|Loss
|align=center|13–6
|Abdul Razak Alhassan
|KO (head kick)
|UFC on ESPN: Barboza vs. Chikadze
|
|align=center|1
|align=center|0:17
|Las Vegas, Nevada, United States
|
|-
|Win
|align=center|13–5
|Joaquin Buckley
|KO (head kick)
|UFC on ABC: Holloway vs. Kattar
|
|align=center|1
|align=center|2:12
|Abu Dhabi, United Arab Emirates
|
|-
|Loss
|align=center|12–5
|Zak Cummings
|Decision (unanimous)
|UFC Fight Night: Smith vs. Rakić
|
|align=center|3
|align=center|5:00
|Las Vegas, Nevada, United States
|
|-
|Loss
|align=center|12–4
|Makhmud Muradov
|Decision (unanimous)
|UFC Fight Night: Hermansson vs. Cannonier 
|
|align=center|3
|align=center|5:00
|Copenhagen, Denmark
|
|-
|Loss
|align=center|12–3
|Kevin Holland
|Decision (unanimous)
|UFC Fight Night: Moicano vs. The Korean Zombie 
|
|align=center|3
|align=center|5:00
|Greenville, South Carolina, United States
|
|-
|Win
|align=center|12–2
|Julian Marquez
|Decision (split)
|The Ultimate Fighter: Undefeated Finale 
|
|align=center|3
|align=center|5:00
|Las Vegas, Nevada, United States
|
|- 
|Win
|align=center|11–2
|Oluwale Bamgbose
|KO (knee)
|UFC on Fox: Lawler vs. dos Anjos 
|
|align=center|2
|align=center|2:14
|Winnipeg, Manitoba, Canada
|
|-
| Loss
| align=center| 10–2
| Eric Spicely
| Submission (triangle choke)
| UFC on Fox: Shevchenko vs. Peña
| 
| align=center| 1
| align=center| 2:14
| Denver, Colorado, United States
|
|-
| Win
| align=center| 10–1
| Garreth McLellan
| Decision (split)
| UFC on Fox: Maia vs. Condit
| 
| align=center| 3
| align=center| 5:00
| Vancouver, British Columbia, Canada
|
|-
| Loss
| align=center| 9–1
| Bojan Veličković
| Decision (unanimous)
| UFC Fight Night: Rothwell vs. dos Santos
| 
| align=center| 3
| align=center| 5:00
| Zagreb, Croatia
|
|-
| Win
| align=center| 9–0
| Andrzej Grzebyk
| Decision (unanimous)
| FEN 9: Go For It
| 
| align=center| 3
| align=center| 5:00
| Wrocław, Poland
|
|-
| Win
| align=center| 8–0
| André Reinders
| TKO (punches)
| Caveam: Bitva Roku 2015
| 
| align=center| 3
| align=center| 5:00
| Prague, Czech Republic
|
|-
| Win
| align=center| 7–0
| Adam Kowalski
| TKO (punches)
| Professional League of MMA 47
| 
| align=center| 2
| align=center| 2:40
| Warsaw, Poland
|
|-
| Win
| align=center| 6–0
| Giovanni Luciani
| Submission (rear-naked choke)
| Centurion Fighting Championship
| 
| align=center| 2
| align=center| 0:41
| Guidonia, Italy
|
|-
| Win
| align=center| 5–0
| Cristian Magro
| TKO (punches)
| Storm FC 5
| 
| align=center| 1
| align=center| 4:15
| Rome, Italy
|
|-
| Win
| align=center| 4–0
| Oleg Medvedev
| Submission (keylock)
| White Rex: Tana Delle Tigri 1
| 
| align=center| 1
| align=center| 3:54
| Rome, Italy
|
|-
| Win
| align=center| 3–0
| Daniele D'Angelo
| TKO (punches)
| Storm FC 3
| 
| align=center| 1
| align=center| 1:25
| Rome, Italy
|
|-
| Win
| align=center| 2–0
| Issa Saidi
| Submission (rear-naked choke)
| Ronin FC 2
| 
| align=center| 1
| align=center| 2:48
| Rome, Italy
|
|-
| Win
| align=center| 1–0
| Mohamed Anoir
| Submission (rear-naked choke)
| Ronin FC 1
| 
| align=center| 1
| align=center| 2:55
| Rome, Italy
|
|-

See also
 List of male mixed martial artists

References

External links
 
 

Living people
1989 births
Italian male mixed martial artists
Middleweight mixed martial artists
Light heavyweight mixed martial artists
Mixed martial artists utilizing kickboxing
Mixed martial artists utilizing freestyle wrestling
Mixed martial artists utilizing Brazilian jiu-jitsu
Italian practitioners of Brazilian jiu-jitsu
Italian players of American football
Sportspeople from Rome
Ultimate Fighting Championship male fighters